Hans-Wilhelm Steinfeld (born 29 March 1951) is a Norwegian journalist, foreign correspondent and non-fiction writer.

He has worked for the Norwegian Broadcasting Corporation (NRK) from 1976, and been a foreign correspondent for NRK in Moscow for four periods. He has written several books. He received the Narvesen Prize in 1990, the Cappelen Prize in 1990, and the Peer Gynt Prize in 1991.

References

1951 births
Living people
Journalists from Bergen
Norwegian non-fiction writers
NRK people
Norwegian television reporters and correspondents
Norwegian people of Jewish descent
Norwegian expatriates in the Soviet Union
Norwegian expatriates in Russia
Mass media people from Bergen